Malcolm Ray Armstead (born 1 August 1989) is an American-born naturalized Kosovan-Romanian professional basketball player for Golden Eagle Ylli of the Kosovo Basketball Superleague. After playing college basketball for Chipola College, University of Oregon and Wichita State University Armstead entered the 2013 NBA draft but was not selected in the draft's two rounds.

Professional career
After going undrafted in the 2013 NBA draft, Armstead signed his first professional contract in August 2013, with the  Slovenian Basket League's Krka Novo Mesto for the 2013–14 season. On June 23, 2014 he re-signed with the club for the 2014–15 season.

On 10 June 2015, he signed with Avtodor Saratov of Russia for the 2014–15 season. On November 16, 2015, he left the club in order to sign with the Greek club AEK Athens for the rest of the 2015–16 Greek Basket League season. On December 25, 2015, he parted ways with AEK, and signed with İstanbul BB of Turkey for the rest of the season.

On 25 August 2016, Armstead signed with Turkish club Yeşilgiresun Belediye for the 2016–17 BSL season.

On 22 September 22, 2017, Armstead signed with Neptūnas Klaipėda. In late October 2017, he left Neptūnas and signed with Greek club Rethymno Cretan Kings.

Armstead spent the 2020–21 season with Fribourg Olympic of the Swiss Basketball League, averaging 14.2 points, 4.7 assists, 1.8 steals and 1.7 rebounds per game. On 28 August 2021, he signed with Kavala B.C.

National team career
In addition to playing for the Kosovan national team, he also played for the Romanian national team.

College statistics

|-
| align="left" | 2009–10
| align="left" | Oregon
| 32 || 27 || 31.7 || .452 || .333 || .725 || 2.6 || 6.3 || 2.0 || .1 || 17.9
|-
| align="left" | 2010–11
| align="left" |  Oregon
| 38 || 23 || 27.5 || .430 || .323 || .795 || 2.9 || 7.4 || 2.3 || .0 || 17.2
|-
| align="left" | 2012–13
| align="left" | Wichita State
| 39 || 39 || 28.5 || .394 || .355 || .827 || 3.8 || 8.0 || 1.9 || .1 || 15.6

References

External links
 Malcolm Armstead at espn.com
 Malcolm Armstead at goducks.com
 Malcolm Armstead at realgm.com

1989 births
Living people
ABA League players
AEK B.C. players
American expatriate basketball people in Greece
American expatriate basketball people in Kosovo
American expatriate basketball people in Lithuania
American expatriate basketball people in Russia
American expatriate basketball people in Slovenia
American expatriate basketball people in Switzerland
American expatriate basketball people in Turkey
American men's basketball players
Basketball players from Alabama
BC Avtodor Saratov players
BC Neptūnas players
Büyükçekmece Basketbol players
Chipola Indians men's basketball players
İstanbul Büyükşehir Belediyespor basketball players
KB Peja players
KB Prishtina players
KK Krka players
Kymis B.C. players
Oregon Ducks men's basketball players
Point guards
Rethymno B.C. players
Romanian men's basketball players
Romanian people of African-American descent
Sportspeople from Florence, Alabama
Wichita State Shockers men's basketball players
Yeşilgiresun Belediye players